Ephesia Grammata ("Ephesian words") are Ancient Greek magical formulas attested from the 5th or 4th century BC. According to Pausanias the Lexicographer (Eust. ad Od. 20, 247, p. 1864), their name derives from their being inscribed on the cult image of Artemis in Ephesus. Clement of Alexandria considers them an invention of the Daktyloi.

Similar to the mantras of Buddhism and Hinduism, they were "meaningless words" (ἄσημα ὀνόματα) potent to protect those who could speak them correctly, their power residing in their sound, so that they were ineffective if mispronounced.
Plutarch (Quaest. Conv. 706D) reports that the Magi instructed victims of demonic possession to recite the Ephesia Grammata.

In the 4th century comedy Lyropoios by Anaxilas, one character carries Ephesia Grammata inscribed on his belt.

The best known Ephesia Grammata are a group of six words: 
 (or )

A version of this formula seems to be attested by a damaged inscription from Himera, Sicily, which must date to before the Carthaginian destruction of the city in 409 BC. The next earliest epigraphic evidence for the formula comes from the 4th century BC, and it continues to re-appear on magical papyri throughout the Hellenistic period. The words sometimes occur in significantly different variants, for example on the lead tablet of Phalasarna, Crete:

There were various attempts by ancient authors to make sense of the words.  was interpreted as the name of a Dactyl.
Androcydes proposed an interpretation as philosophical symbols (Clement, Stromata 5, 8, 45, 2):

See also
Voces magicae
Charaktêres

References

Magic words
Greek religion inscriptions
Ephesus